Andreas Busse (born 6 May 1959 in Dresden, Bezirk Dresden) is a former middle distance runner, who represented East Germany during his career. He was a member of the Sportclub Einheit Dresden.

Personal bests

800 metres: 1:44.72 min, 10 May 1980, Potsdam 
800m indoors: 1:47.1 min, 11 February 1981, Cosford
1000 Metres: 2:15.25 min, 31 July 1983, East Berlin 
1500 Metres: 3:34.10 min, 21 July 1984 Potsdam
1 Mile: 3:53.55 min, 20 August 1982, West Berlin 
3000 Metres: 7:51.17 min, 20 June 1988, Düsseldorf

International competitions

References

1959 births
Living people
Athletes from Dresden
People from Bezirk Dresden
East German male middle-distance runners
German male middle-distance runners
Olympic athletes of East Germany
Athletes (track and field) at the 1980 Summer Olympics
World Athletics Championships athletes for East Germany
Friendship Games medalists in athletics